Jocelyn Rae and Anna Smith were the defending champions and successfully defended their title, defeating Czech-duo Lenka Kunčíková and Karolína Stuchlá in the final, 6–4, 6–1.

Seeds

Draw

References 
 Draw

Engie Open de Seine-et-Marne - Doubles